The Togolese People's Movement (MPT) was a political party in Togo between 1954 and 1967.

History
The party was established on 16 August 1954 following a split in the Togolese Party of Progress over the sacking of John Atayi. The MPT received 1.4% of the vote in the 1955 Territorial Assembly elections, failing to win a seat. Its vote share fell to 0.3% in the 1958 elections, again failing to win a seat.

Following the 1963 coup, the MPT was one of four to form the Reconciliation and National Union, a single electoral list to contest the elections later that year, with each party holding 14 seats. Its leader Nicolas Grunitzky was the sole presidential candidate.

However, following another coup in 1967, the party was dissolved.

Electoral history

Presidential elections

National Assembly elections

References

Defunct political parties in Togo
Political parties established in 1954
1954 establishments in French Togoland
Political parties disestablished in 1967
1967 disestablishments in Togo